Connectomics is the production and study of connectomes: comprehensive maps of connections within an organism's nervous system. More generally, it can be thought of as the study of neuronal wiring diagrams with a focus on how structural connectivity, individual synapses, cellular morphology, and cellular ultrastructure contribute to the make up of a network. The nervous system is a network made of billions of connections and these connections are responsible for our thoughts, emotions, actions, memories, function and dysfunction. Therefore, the study of connectomics aims to advance our understanding of mental health and cognition by understanding how cells in the nervous system are connected and communicate. Because these structures are extremely complex, methods within this field use a high-throughput application of functional and structural neural imaging, most commonly magnetic resonance imaging (MRI), electron microscopy, and histological techniques in order to increase the speed, efficiency, and resolution of these nervous system maps. To date, tens of large scale datasets have been collected spanning the nervous system including the various areas of cortex, cerebellum, the retina, the peripheral nervous system and neuromuscular junctions.

Generally speaking, there are two types of connectomes; macroscale and microscale. Macroscale connectomics refers to using functional and structural MRI data to map out large fiber tracts and functional gray matter areas within the brain in terms of blood flow (functional) and water diffusivity (structural). Microscale connectomics is the mapping of small organisms' complete connectome using microscopy and histology. That is, all connections that exist in their central nervous system.

Methods

Macroscale Connectomics 
Macroscale connectomes are commonly collected using diffusion magnetic resonance imaging (dMRI) and functional magnetic resonance imaging (fMRI). dMRI datasets can span the entire brain, imaging white matter between the cortex and subcortex. In contrast, fMRI datasets measure cerebral blood flow in the brain, as a marker of neuronal activation. One of the benefits of MRI is it offers in vivo information about connectivity between different brain areas. Macroscale connectomics has furthered our understanding of various brain networks including visual, brainstem, and language networks, among others.

Microscale Connectomics 
On the other hand, microscale connectomes focus on a much smaller area of the nervous system with much higher resolution. These datasets are commonly collected using electron microscopy imaging  and offer single synapse resolution of entire local circuits. Some of the milestones in EM connectomics include the entire nervous system of C. elegans, an entire fly brain, and most recently a millimeter cube from both mouse and human cortex.

Tools 
One of the main tools used for connectomics research at the macroscale level is MRI. When used together, a resting-state fMRI and a dMRI dataset provide a comprehensive view of how regions of the brain are structurally connected, and how closely they are communicating. The main tool for connectomics research at the microscale level is chemical brain preservation followed by 3D electron microscopy, used for neural circuit reconstruction. Correlative microscopy, which combines fluorescence with 3D electron microscopy, results in more interpretable data as is it able to automatically detect specific neuron types and can trace them in their entirety using fluorescent markers.

To see one of the first micro-connectomes at full-resolution, visit the Open Connectome Project, which is hosting several connectome datasets, including the 12TB dataset from Bock et al. (2011).

Model systems 
Aside from the human brain, some of the model systems used for connectomics research are the mouse, the fruit fly, the nematode C. elegans, and the barn owl.

Applications 

By comparing diseased and healthy connectomes, we can gain insight into certain psychopathologies, such as neuropathic pain, and potential therapies for them. Generally, the field of neuroscience would benefit from standardization and raw data. For example, connectome maps can be used to inform computational models of whole-brain dynamics. Current neural networks mostly rely on probabilistic representations of connectivity patterns. Connectivity matrices (checkerboard diagrams of connectomics) have been used in stroke recovery to evaluate the response to treatment via Transcranial Magnetic Stimulation. Similarly, connectograms (circular diagrams of connectomics) have been used in traumatic brain injury cases to document the extent of damage to neural networks.

The human connectome can be viewed as a graph, and the rich tools, definitions and algorithms of the Graph theory can be applied to these graphs. Comparing the connectomes (or braingraphs) of healthy women and men, Szalkai et al. have shown that in several deep graph-theoretical parameters, the structural connectome of women is significantly better connected than that of men. For example, women's connectome has more edges, higher minimum bipartition width, larger eigengap, greater minimum vertex cover than that of men. The minimum bipartition width (or, in other words, the minimum balanced cut) is a well-known measure of quality of computer multistage interconnection networks, it describes the possible bottlenecks in network communication: The higher this value is, the better is the network. The larger eigengap shows that the female connectome is better expander graph than the connectome of males. The better expanding property, the higher minimum bipartition width and the greater minimum vertex cover show deep advantages in network connectivity in the case of female braingraph.

Local measures of difference between populations of those graph have been also introduced (e.g. to compare case versus control groups). Those can be found by using either an adjusted t-test, or a sparsity model, with the aim of finding statistically significant connections which are different among those groups.
 
Human connectomes have an individual variability, which can be measured with the cumulative distribution function, as it was shown in. By analyzing the individual variability of the human connectomes in distinct cerebral areas, it was found that the frontal and the limbic lobes are more conservative, and the edges in the temporal and occipital lobes are more diverse. A "hybrid" conservative/diverse distribution was detected in the paracentral lobule and the fusiform gyrus. Smaller cortical areas were also evaluated: precentral gyri were found to be more conservative, and the postcentral and the superior temporal gyri to be very diverse.

Comparison to genomics 
The human genome project initially faced many of the above criticisms, but was nevertheless completed ahead of schedule and has led to many advances in genetics. Some have argued that analogies can be made between genomics and connectomics, and therefore we should be at least slightly more optimistic about the prospects in connectomics. Others have criticized attempts towards a microscale connectome, arguing that we don't have enough knowledge about where to look for insights, or that it cannot be completed within a realistic time frame.

Eyewire game 

Eyewire is an online game developed by American scientist Sebastian Seung of Princeton University. It uses social computing to help map the connectome of the brain. It has attracted over 130,000 players from over 100 countries.

Public Datasets 

Websites to explore publicly available connectomics datasets:

Macroscale Connectomics (Healthy Young Adult Datasets)

 Human Connectome Project Young Adult
 Amsterdam Open MRI Collection
 Harvard Brain Genomic Superstruct Project

For a more comprehensive list of open macroscale datasets, check out this article

Microscale Connectomics

 Whole C. elegans connectome
 NeuPRINT  Fly Hemibrain
 Flywire (whole fly brain)
 MICrONS Explorer (mouse cortical data)
 H01 Browser Release (human cortical data)

See also
 Dynamic Functional Connectivity
 List of Functional Connectivity Software
 Human Connectome Project
 Budapest Reference Connectome
https://eyewire.org/explore

References

Further reading

External links
  The NIH Blueprint for Neuroscience Research
 TED talk by Sebastian Seung: "I am my connectome".
 braingraph.org: a database of hundreds of braingraphs, computed from the data of the Human Connectome Project

Omics
Neuroscience